The 2015 South Kesteven District Council election took place on 7 May 2015 to elect members of South Kesteven District Council in Lincolnshire, England. The whole council was up for election after boundary changes reduced the number of seats by two. The Conservative party stayed in overall control of the council.

Background
After the previous election in 2011 the Conservatives remained in control of the council with 38 seats, compared to 12 independents, 6 for Labour and 1 each for the Liberal Democrats and Lincolnshire Independents. By the time of the 2015 election there were two UK Independence Party councillors, after Mike and Jean Taylor defected from the Conservatives in January 2015, following their failure to be re-selected as Conservative candidates for the council election. Meanwhile, in Harrowby ward the Labour councillors Ian Selby and Bruce Wells stood as independents after they were deselected by Labour.

The Conservative leader of the council Linda Neal stood down at the 2015 election, with Bob Adams being chosen to succeed her as Conservative group leader. A seat in Bourne West was vacant by the election after the death of Conservative councillor John Smith, while in Market and West Deeping ward the election was postponed until 25 June after the death of independent councillor Reg Howard.

Boundary changes since the 2011 election reduced the number of councillors from 58 to 56, while the number of wards declined from 34 to 30.

Election result
The Conservatives kept a large majority on the council after winning 44 of the 53 seats contested on 7 May. The three seats in Market and West Deeping elected on 25 June had two independents and one Conservative councillors elected.

The above totals include the delayed election in Market and West Deeping ward.

Ward results

Market and West Deeping countermanded election
The election in Market and West Deeping ward was countermanded (delayed) until 25 June 2015 after the death of independent councillor Reg Howard who had been standing for re-election. Two of the three seats were won by independents Robert Broughton and Ashley Baxter, while Conservative Nicholas Neilson won the third seat.

By-elections between 2015 and 2019

Belvoir by-election

Deeping St James by-election

Stamford St George's by-election

Stamford St John's by-election

References

South Kesteven District Council elections
2015 English local elections
May 2015 events in the United Kingdom